The Purple Plain is a 1947 war novel by the British writer H. E. Bates. It is set during the Burma Campaign of the Second World War.

Film adaptation
In 1954, it was adapted into a British film The Purple Plain directed by Robert Parrish and starring Gregory Peck, Win Min Than and Bernard Lee.

References

Bibliography
 Goble, Alan. The Complete Index to Literary Sources in Film. Walter de Gruyter, 1999.

1947 British novels
Novels set during World War II
Novels set in Myanmar
British novels adapted into films
Michael Joseph books
Novels by H. E. Bates